Lysistrata ( or ; Attic Greek: , Lysistrátē, "Army Disbander") is an ancient Greek comedy by Aristophanes, originally performed in classical Athens in 411 BC. It is a comic account of a woman's extraordinary mission to end the Peloponnesian War between Greek city states by denying all the men of the land any sex, which was the only thing they truly and deeply desired. Lysistrata persuades the women of the warring cities to withhold sexual privileges from their husbands and lovers as a means of forcing the men to negotiate peace—a strategy, however, that inflames the battle between the sexes.

The play is notable for being an early exposé of sexual relations in a male-dominated society. Additionally, its dramatic structure represents a shift from the conventions of Old Comedy, a trend typical of the author's career. It was produced in the same year as the Thesmophoriazusae, another play with a focus on gender-based issues, just two years after Athens' catastrophic defeat in the Sicilian Expedition.

Plot
               LYSISTRATA
    There are a lot of things about us women
    That sadden me, considering how men
    See us as rascals.
               CALONICE
    As indeed we are!

These lines, spoken by the Athenian Lysistrata and her friend Calonice at the beginning of the play, set the scene for the action that follows. Women, as represented by Calonice, are sly hedonists in need of firm guidance and direction. Lysistrata, however, is an extraordinary woman with a large sense of individual and social responsibility. She has convened a meeting of women from various Greek city-states that are at war with each other.  (There is no explanation of how she manages this, but the satirical nature of the play makes this unimportant.)  Soon after she confides in her friend her concerns for the female sex, the women begin arriving.

With support from the Spartan Lampito, Lysistrata persuades the other women to withhold sexual privileges from their menfolk as a means of forcing them to conclude the Peloponnesian War. The women are very reluctant, but the deal is sealed with a solemn oath around a wine bowl, Lysistrata choosing the words and Calonice repeating them on behalf of the other women. It is a long and detailed oath, in which the women abjure all their sexual pleasures, including the "lioness on the cheese-grater".

Soon after the oath is finished, a cry of triumph is heard from the nearby Acropolis—the old women of Athens have seized control of it at Lysistrata's instigation, since it holds the state treasury, without which the men cannot long continue to fund their war. Lampito goes off to spread the word of revolt, and the other women retreat behind the barred gates of the Acropolis to await the men's response.

A Chorus of Old Men arrives, intent on burning down the gate of the Acropolis if the women do not open up. Encumbered with heavy timbers, inconvenienced with smoke and burdened with old age, they are still making preparations to assault the gate when a Chorus of Old Women arrives, bearing pitchers of water. The Old Women complain about the difficulty they had getting the water, but they are ready for a fight in defence of their younger comrades. Threats are exchanged, water beats fire, and the Old Men are discomfited with a soaking.

The magistrate then arrives with some Scythian Archers (the Athenian version of police constables). He reflects on the hysterical nature of women, their devotion to wine, promiscuous sex, and exotic cults (such as to Sabazius and Adonis), but above all he blames men for poor supervision of their womenfolk. He has come for silver from the state treasury to buy oars for the fleet and he instructs his Scythians to begin levering open the gate.

Lysistrata restores order and she allows the magistrate to question her. She explains the frustrations that women feel at a time of war when the men make stupid decisions that affect everyone, and further complains that their wives' opinions are not listened to. She drapes her headdress over him, gives him a basket of wool and tells him that war will be a woman's business from now on. She then explains the pity she feels for young, childless women, ageing at home while the men are away on endless campaigns. When the magistrate points out that men also age, she reminds him that men can marry at any age whereas a woman has only a short time before she is considered too old. She then dresses the magistrate like a corpse for laying out, with a wreath and a fillet, and advises him that he's dead. Outraged at these indignities, he storms off to report the incident to his colleagues, while Lysistrata returns to the Acropolis.

The debate or agon is continued between the Chorus of Old Men and the Chorus of Old Women until Lysistrata returns to the stage with some news—her comrades are desperate for sex and they are beginning to desert on the silliest pretexts (for example, one woman says she has to go home to air her fabrics by spreading them on the bed). After rallying her comrades and restoring their discipline, Lysistrata again returns to the Acropolis to continue waiting for the men's surrender.

A man suddenly appears, desperate for sex. It is Kinesias, the husband of Myrrhine. Lysistrata instructs her to torture him. Myrrhine informs Kinesias that she will have sex with him but only if he promises to end the war. He promptly agrees to these terms and the young couple prepares for sex on the spot. Myrrhine fetches a bed, then a mattress, then a pillow, then a blanket, then a flask of oil, exasperating her husband with delays until finally disappointing him completely by locking herself in the Acropolis again. The Chorus of Old Men commiserates with the young man in a plaintive song.

A Spartan herald then appears with a large burden (an erection) scarcely hidden inside his tunic and he requests to see the ruling council to arrange peace talks. The magistrate, now also sporting a prodigious burden, laughs at the herald's embarrassing situation but agrees that peace talks should begin.

They go off to fetch the delegates. While they are gone, the Old Women make overtures to the Old Men. The Old Men are content to be comforted and fussed over by the Old Women; thereupon the two Choruses merge, singing and dancing in unison. Peace talks commence and Lysistrata introduces the Spartan and Athenian delegates to a gorgeous young woman called Reconciliation. The delegates cannot take their eyes off the young woman; meanwhile, Lysistrata scolds both sides for past errors of judgment. The delegates briefly squabble over the peace terms, but with Reconciliation before them and the burden of sexual deprivation still heavy upon them, they quickly overcome their differences and retire to the Acropolis for celebrations.  The war is ended.

Another choral song follows.  After a bit of humorous dialogue between tipsy dinner guests, the celebrants all return to the stage for a final round of songs, the men and women dancing together.  All sing a merry song in praise of Athene, goddess of wisdom and chastity, whose citadel provided a refuge for the women during the events of the comedy, and whose implied blessing has brought about a happy ending to the play.

Historical background
Some events that are significant for understanding the play:
 424 BC: The Knights won first prize at the Lenaia. Its protagonist, a sausage-seller named Agoracritus, emerges at the end of the play as the improbable saviour of Athens (Lysistrata is its saviour thirteen years later).
 421 BC: Peace was produced. Its protagonist, Trygaeus, emerges as the improbable champion of universal peace (Lysistrata's role 10 years later). The Peace of Nicias was formalised this same year, ending the first half of the Peloponnesian War (referred to in Lysistrata as "The Former War").
 413 BC: The Athenians and their allies suffered a catastrophic defeat in the Sicilian Expedition, a turning-point in the long-running Peloponnesian War.
 411 BC: Both Thesmophoriazusae and Lysistrata were produced; an oligarchic revolution (one of the consequences of the Sicilian disaster) proved briefly successful.

Old Comedy was a highly topical genre and the playwright expected his audience to be familiar with local identities and issues. The following list of identities mentioned in the play gives some indication of the difficulty faced by any producer trying to stage Lysistrata for modern audiences.
 Korybantes: Devotees of the Asiatic goddess Cybele—Lysistrata says that Athenian men resemble them when they do their shopping in full armour, a habit she and the other women deplore.
 Hermokopidae: Vandals who mutilated the herms in Athens at the onset of the Sicilian Expedition, they are mentioned in the play as a reason why the peace delegates should not remove their cloaks, in case they too are vandalized.
 Hippias: An Athenian tyrant, he receives two mentions in the play, as a sample of the kind of tyranny that the Old Men can "smell" in the revolt by the women and secondly in connection with a good service that the Spartans once rendered Athens (they removed him from power by force)
 Aristogeiton: A famous tyrannicide, he is mentioned briefly here with approval by the Old Men.
 Cimon: An Athenian commander, mentioned here by Lysistrata in connection with the Spartan king Pericleides who had once requested and obtained Athenian help in putting down a revolt by helots.
 Myronides: An Athenian general in the 450s, he is mentioned by the Old Men as a good example of a hairy guy, together with Phormio, the Athenian admiral who swept the Spartans from the sea between 430 and 428 BC.
 Peisander: An Athenian aristocrat and oligarch, he is mentioned here by Lysistrata as typical of a corrupt politician exploiting the war for personal gain. He was previously mentioned in Peace and The Birds
 Demostratus: An Athenian who proposed and carried the motion in support of the Sicilian Expedition, he is mentioned briefly by the magistrate.
 Cleisthenes: A notoriously effete homosexual and the butt of many jokes in Old Comedy, he receives two mentions here, firstly as a suspected mediator between the Spartans and the Athenian women and secondly as someone that sex-starved Athenian men are beginning to consider a viable proposition.
 Theogenes: A nouveau riche politician, he is mentioned here as the husband of a woman who is expected to attend the meeting called by Lysistrata. He is lampooned earlier in The Wasps, Peace and The Birds.
 Lycon: A minor politician who afterwards figured significantly in the trial of Socrates, he is mentioned here merely as the husband of a woman that the Old Men have a particular dislike for (he is mentioned also in The Wasps).
 Cleomenes I: A Spartan king, who is mentioned by the Old Men in connection with the heroism of ordinary Athenians in resisting Spartan interference in their politics.
 Leonidas: The famous Spartan king who led a Greek force against the Persians at Thermopylae, he is mentioned by the Spartan envoys in association with the Athenian victory against the Persian fleet at the Battle of Artemisium.
 Artemisia: A female ruler of Ionia, famous for her participation in the naval Battle of Salamis, she is mentioned by the Old Men with awe as a kind of Amazon.
 Homer: The epic poet is quoted in a circuitous manner when Lysistrata quotes her husband who quotes from a speech by Hector in the Iliad as he farewells his wife before going to battle: "War will be men's business."
 Aeschylus: The tragic poet is mentioned briefly as the source of a ferocious oath that Lysistrata proposes to her comrades, in which a shield is to be filled with blood; the oath is found in Aeschylus' Seven Against Thebes.
 Euripides: The dramatic poet receives two brief mentions here, in each case by the Old Men with approval as a misogynist.
 Pherecrates: A contemporary comic poet, he is quoted by Lysistrata as the author of the saying: "to skin a flayed dog."
 Bupalus: A sculptor who is known to have made a caricature of the satirist Hipponax he is mentioned here briefly by the Old Men in reference to their own desire to assault rebellious women.
 Micon: An artist, he is mentioned briefly by the Old Men in reference to Amazons (because he depicted a battle between Theseus and Amazons on the Painted Stoa).
 Timon: The legendary misanthrope, he is mentioned here with approval by the Old Women in response to the Old Men's favourable mention of Melanion, a legendary misogynist
 Orsilochus and Pellene: An Athenian pimp and a prostitute, mentioned briefly to illustrate sexual desire.
Pellene was also the name of a Peloponnesian town resisting Spartan pressure to contribute to naval operations against Athens at this time. It was mentioned earlier in the Birds.

Interpretation
Modern adaptations of Lysistrata are often feminist and/or pacifist in their aim (see Influence and legacy below). The original play was neither feminist nor unreservedly pacifist. Even when they seemed to demonstrate empathy with the female condition, dramatic poets in classical Athens still reinforced sexual stereotyping of women as irrational creatures in need of protection from themselves and from others.

In fact the play might not even be a plea for an end to the war so much as an imaginative vision of an honorable end to the war at a time when no such ending was possible. According to Sarah Ruden, Lysistrata (Hackett Classics, 2003), the play "nowhere suggests that warfare in itself is intolerable, let alone immoral" (87).

Old Comedy
Lysistrata belongs to the middle period of Aristophanes' career when he was beginning to diverge significantly from the conventions of Old Comedy. Such variations from convention include:
 The divided Chorus: The Chorus begins this play being divided (Old Men versus Old Women), and its unification later exemplifies the major theme of the play: reconciliation. There is nothing quite like this use of a Chorus in the other plays.  A doubling of the role of the Chorus occurs in two other middle-period plays, The Frogs and Thesmophoriazusae, but in each of those plays the two Choruses appear consecutively and not simultaneously. The nearest equivalent to Lysistrata's divided Chorus is found in the earliest of the surviving plays, The Acharnians, where the Chorus very briefly divides into factions for and against the protagonist.
 Parabasis: In Classical Greek comedy, parabasis is 'a speech in which the chorus comes forward and addresses the audience'. The parabasis is an important, conventional element in Old Comedy. There is no parabasis proper in Lysistrata. Most plays have a second parabasis near the end and there is something like a parabasis in that position in this play but it comprises only two songs (strophe and antistrophe) and these are separated by an episodic scene of dialogue. In these two songs, the now united Chorus declares that it is not prepared to speak ill of anyone on this occasion because the current situation (ta parakeímena) is already bad enough—topical reference to the catastrophic end to the Sicilian Expedition. In keeping however with the victim-centered approach of Old Comedy, the Chorus then teases the entire audience with false generosity, offering gifts that are not in its power to give.
 Agon: The Roman orator Quintilian considered Old Comedy a good genre for study by students of rhetoric and the plays of Aristophanes in fact contain formal disputes or agons that are constructed for rhetorical effect. Lysistrata's debate with the proboulos (magistrate) is an unusual agon in that one character (Lysistrata) does almost all the talking while the antagonist (the magistrate) merely asks questions or expresses indignation. The informality of the agon draws attention to the absurdity of a classical woman engaging in public debate. Like most agons, however, it is structured symmetrically in two sections, each half comprising long verses of anapests that are introduced by a choral song and that end in a pnigos. In the first half of the agon, Lysistrata quotes from Homer's Iliad ("war will be men's business"), then quotes 'the man in the street' ("Isn't there a man in the country?"—"No, by God, there isn't!") and finally arrives at the only logical conclusion to these premises: "War will be women's business!" The logic of this conclusion is supported rhythmically by the pnigos, during which Lysistrata and her friends dress the magistrate like a woman, with a veil and a basket of wool, reinforcing her argument and lending it ironic point—if the men are women, obviously the war can only be women's business. During the pnigos of the second section, the magistrate is dressed like a corpse, highlighting the argument that war is a living death for women. The agon in Lysistrata is thus a fine example of rhetoric even though it is unusually one-sided.

Influence and legacy

 c. 1611: John Fletcher wrote his play The Woman's Prize, or The Tamer Tamed, which echoes Lysistrata's sex-strike plot.
 1902: Adapted as an operetta by Paul Lincke.
 1910: Performed at the Little Theatre in the Adelphi in London with Gertrude Kingston in the title role.
 1941: Adapted as a ballet by Richard Mohaupt, followed by a ballet suite (1946) and a new ballet version titled Der Weiberstreik von Athen (1957).
 1956: Lysistrata became in the 1950s The Second Greatest Sex, a movie musical with songs by Henry Mancini produced at Universal Studios and directed by George Marshall, starring Jeanne Crain, George Nader and Bert Lahr.  It was re-set improbably in the 19th-century American wild west.
 1961: The play served as the basis for the musical The Happiest Girl in the World. The play was revived in the National Theatre's 1992–93 season, transferring successfully from the South Bank to Wyndham's Theatre.
 1968: Feminist director Mai Zetterling made a radical film Flickorna (released in English as The Girls), starring three reigning Swedish film actresses: Bibi Andersson, Harriet Andersson and Gunnel Lindblom, who were depicted playing roles in Lysistrata.
   1982: Utopia's album Swing to the Right featured an anti-war song entitled "Lysistrata" that loosely paraphrases the content of the drama as dialogue between the song's protagonist and his female significant other.
 1983: Şalvar Davası, a Turkish movie adaptation based loosely on Lysistrata of director Kartal Tibet starring Müjde Ar as Lysistrata.
1984: On the Perimeter by Caroline Blackwood compared activists at Greenham Common Women's Peace Camp to women of Lysistrata since "both groups of women banded together and rejected men in order to protest the pointlessness of war ..."
 1985: David Brin's post-apocalyptic novel The Postman, which had themes of duty, war, peace, and gender roles, is dedicated: "To Benjamin Franklin, devious genius, and to Lysistrata, who tried".
 2003: In reaction to the Iraq disarmament crisis, a peace protest initiative, The Lysistrata Project, was based on readings of the play held worldwide on March 3, 2003. 
 2004: A 100-person show called Lysistrata 100 was performed in Brooklyn, New York.  Edward Einhorn wrote the adaptation, which was performed in a former warehouse converted to a pub. The play was set at the Dionysia, much as the original may have been.
 2005: An opera, Lysistrata, or The Nude Goddess, composed by Mark Adamo,  premiered at the Houston Grand Opera in March.
 2011: Lysistrata Jones, a contemporary riff by Douglas Carter Beane (book) and Lewis Flinn (music, lyrics) for the Transport Group Theater Company, starred Patti Murin and Liz Mikel, and opened in New York at the Judson Memorial Church Gymnasium and later transferred to Broadway.
 2011: Valerie Schrag adapted and illustrated the play for volume one of the graphic-novel anthology The Graphic Canon, edited by Russ Kick and published by Seven Stories Press.
 2011: Radu Mihăileanu directed The Source set in a village in North Africa, focusing on a group of women who go on strike against having to fetch water for the village from a distant, treacherous well.
 2012: Isabelle Ameganvi, a civil-rights lawyer in Togo (Africa), called on the women of Togo to deny sexual relations with their men in protest against President Faure Gnassingbé.
 2015: American filmmaker Spike Lee's film Chi-Raq transposes the events of the play into modern-day inner-city Chicago, substituting gun violence among African-Americans for the Peloponnesian War and rhyming rap dialog for the more formal Greek poetry.
 2016: Animator Richard Williams's Oscar-nominated short film, Prologue, is "the first part of a feature film loosely based on Aristophanes’ anti-war play Lysisrata."
 2016: Writer-director Matt Cooper's film comedy Is That a Gun in Your Pocket? is about a Texas town whose women go on a sex strike to make their menfolk abandon their love of guns.

English translations

 1872, William James Hickie, The Comedies of Aristophanes. A New and Literal Translation, Vol 2 (London: Bohn's Library).
 1912, published by the Athenian Society, London; unknown translator rumored to be Oscar Wilde. At Wikisource
 1924, Benjamin B. Rogers, verse
 1925, Jack Lindsay, verse
 1934, Arthur S. Way, verse
 1944, Charles T. Murphy, prose and verse
 1954, Dudley Fitts, prose and verse
 1961, Donald Sutherland, prose and verse
 1963, Douglass Parker, verse
 1972, Germaine Greer, prose
 1973, Alan H. Sommerstein, prose and verse: available for digital loan
 1988, Jeffrey Henderson, verse
 1991, Nicholas Rudall
 2000, George Theodoridis, 2000, prose
 2002, David Landon, prose and verse
 2003, Sarah Ruden
 2004, Paul Roche, verse and prose
 2005, Edward Einhorn, prose and verse
 2003/06, Chris Tilley, musical version with prose and songs
 2008, Ian C. Johnston, verse
 2010, David Stuttard, prose and verse
 Anonymous translator, prose

See also
 Sex strike
 Codex Ravennas 429

References

External links
 
 
 Full script of "Lysistrata" in English (by Jack Lindsay) and original Greek via the Perseus Project.
 Full script of Lysistrata as adapted by Edward Einhorn.
 Excerpts from Lysistrata with illustrations by Aubrey Beardsley.
 Lysistrata & the War: A Comic Opera in Mozartian Style"]—updated from the ancient Greek play.
 Lysistrata text in English—The EServer Drama Collection (Iowa State University).[http://www.audiobooksworld.org/lysistrata Lysistrata audiobook'' - Listen to streaming audio online and download in MP3 format.
 Negro Repertory Company: Lysistrata, on the controversial 1937 production of the play by the Seattle Branch of the Federal Theater Project.
 

Anti-war plays
Anti-war protests
Censored books
Greek plays adapted into films
Plays by Aristophanes
Plays set in ancient Greece
Plays set in Athens
Satirical plays
Sexuality in ancient Greece
Sexuality in fiction
Women in war
Women's protests